The Carpenter is a 1988 horror film directed by David Wellington, and written by Doug Taylor.

Plot
After being released from the institution in Québec where she was placed in after suffering a mental breakdown, housewife Alice Jarett relocates to the country of Canada with her husband Martin, a professor. The house the couple moves into was never finished, so Martin hires a cheap construction crew to complete it. One night, Alice is awakened by hammering in the basement, caused by a carpenter she had not seen with the rest of the crew. Unlike the other workers, this one has a pleasant demeanor and good work ethic, and while Martin is away one night, he stops another carpenter from trying to rape Alice by cutting the man's arms off with a circular saw, sending the dazed Alice back to bed, and cleaning up the mess afterward.

Alice has a few more run-ins with the carpenter, and comes to the conclusion that he is the spirit of the house's builder, a man named Edward who was executed for killing several repo men when his obsession with perfecting his home caused him to incur massive debt. Despite Ed's murderous past, Alice finds herself falling for his charms, even after witnessing him murder two disgruntled former workers who break into the house to loot it.

One day, one of Martin's students, Laura Bell, shows up at the house, to confess to Alice that she and Martin are having an affair, and that she is pregnant with his child. An argument breaks out between Laura and Alice, who kills Laura with a nail gun with help from Ed. When Martin returns home and discovers Laura's mangled body, he attacks Alice, but is subdued and has his head crushed in a vise by Ed. Sometime later, Alice's sister Rachel stops by, and tries to leave with Alice after spotting Martin and Laura's bodies, but she is stopped by Ed, who gets violent with her. Angered by Ed harming her sister, Alice turns against him, and the two fight. During the scuffle, Alice realizes that damaging the house hurts Ed, so she starts a fire with a blow torch. As the flames spread through the house, Alice and a recovered Rachel flee, being briefly chased by Ed before he burns away.

Cast
 Wings Hauser as Edward Byrd
 Lynne Adams as Alice Jarett
 Pierre Lenoir as Martin Jarett
 Barbara Ann Jones as Rachel
 Louise-Marie Mennier as Laura Bell
 Johnny Cuthbert as Roland
 Robert Austern as Barns
 Anthony Ulc as Landis
 Bob Pot as Barry Farnsworth
 Richard Jutras as Mr. Mort
 Ron Lea as Sheriff Jonah "J.J." Johnston
 Beverly Murray as Crazy Woman
 Griffith Brewer as Doctor Flanders
 Anne Farquhar as Nurse
 David Gow as Larry
 Theresa Jutras as Bleeding Woman
 Nancy Brayman as Real Estate Agent

Reception
DVD Talk gave The Carpenter three stars out of five, opening its review with "Even by the admittedly low standards of the slasher film, The Carpenter is goofy. Not just in premise, mind you, but in execution as well. Goofy, however, can also be fun which is absolutely the case with this low budget horror film". Despite deeming the finale weak, DVD Verdict also enjoyed the film, writing that it was "filled with quirky characters, and this—at least for me—is why The Carpenter works. As a horror film, it's pretty silly (as is the wont of horror films) but it proceeds with a logic dictated by its characters that makes it far more interesting and entertaining than the usual slasher pic". Oh, the Horror! had a lukewarm reaction to film (which they described as being "like Ghost if Swayze were psychotic") and concluded "I can somewhat recommend it, if only because some moments are absurdly brilliant".

Home media
The film was released on DVD by Scorpion on November 11, 2011. The only special features it contained were an optional intro and epilogue by Katarina Waters.

References

Bibliography

External links
 
 
 

1988 films
Canadian ghost films
Canadian slasher films
1988 horror films
Canadian black comedy films
English-language Canadian films
Haunted house films
Romantic horror films
Canadian romance films
Films shot in Montreal
Films about architecture
Canadian supernatural horror films
Fictional carpenters
1980s slasher films
1980s English-language films
1980s Canadian films